Algeria is scheduled to compete at the 2024 Summer Olympics in Paris from 26 July to 11 August 2024. It will be the nation's fifteenth appearance at the Summer Olympics except for Montreal 1976 as part of the Congolese-led boycott.

Competitors
The following is the list of number of competitors in the Games.

Cycling

Road
Algeria entered one rider to compete in the men's road race by finishing in the top two at the 2023 African Championships in Accra, Ghana.

References

External links

Nations at the 2024 Summer Olympics
2024
2024 in Algerian sport